Saint Medard is a town in the Arcahaie commune of the Arcahaie Arrondissement, in the Ouest department of Haiti. It is located 3 kilometers north of Arcahaie communal section.

See also
Arcahaie, for a list of other settlements in the commune.

References

Populated places in Ouest (department)